Pro Evolution Soccer 3 (known as World Soccer: Winning Eleven 7 in Japan and World Soccer: Winning Eleven 7 International in North America) is a football simulation video game developed and produced by Konami as part of the Pro Evolution Soccer series. Initially released for the PlayStation 2, it is also the first in the series to be released on Microsoft Windows.

The cover features the image and signature of iconic Italian referee Pierluigi Collina, who had previously officiated the 2002 FIFA World Cup Final. This was unusual, as football games had come to almost exclusively feature only players and managers on their covers; plus, referees only appear in cutscenes in this game (they would only be integrated to the playing field in the next entry of the series). PES 3 was succeeded by Pro Evolution Soccer 4, which was released in 2004.

New features 

 New graphics engine.
 Improved gameplay, control, ball physics, animation and AI.
 New Shop mode, where points can be traded in for hidden items.
 Master League expanded to four divisions, with tons of new players.
 Support for 1–4 players (multitap required for 3 or 4 players).

Licenses 
The game does not include any full leagues but 64 clubs from various European countries. 6 clubs are fully licensed, which are the five Italian Serie A clubs Milan, Roma, Juventus, Lazio and Parma, as well as  Feyenoord from the Dutch Eredivisie. All other clubs have fictional team names, logos and jerseys. Also player names are fictional, but only if the player is part of an unlicensed national team. Noticeable cases are for example Dutch players (e.g. Von Mistelroum instead of Ruud van Nistelrooy) and German players (e.g. Kalm instead of Oliver Kahn).

Reception 

In Europe, Pro Evolution Soccer 3 sold  copies on its first day of release, setting a launch sales record. The PlayStation 2 version of Pro Evolution Soccer 3 had surpassed 1 million units sold by November 2003. The PS2 version went on to sell 1.16million units in Japan and 1.55million units in Europe for a combined  by the end of 2003. The PlayStation 2 version of Pro Evolution Soccer 3 received a "Platinum" sales award from the Entertainment and Leisure Software Publishers Association (ELSPA), indicating sales of at least 300,000 copies in the United Kingdom. In the United States, it sold 33,403 units by January 2005, adding up to at least  units sold worldwide.

The "International" version of World Soccer: Winning Eleven 7 received "universal acclaim" for both platforms in all regions except the European PC version, which received "favorable" reviews, according to video game review aggregator Metacritic. It received a runner-up position in GameSpots 2004 "Best Traditional Sports Game" award category across all platforms, losing to ESPN NFL 2K5.

References

External links 

2003 video games
Association football video games
Golden Joystick Award winners
PlayStation 2 games
3
Video games developed in Japan
Windows games